Hinde's lesser house bat (Scotoecus hindei) is a species of vesper bat. It is found in Cameroon, Republic of the Congo, Kenya, Malawi, Mozambique, Nigeria, Somalia, South Sudan, Tanzania, and Zambia. Its natural habitat is dry savanna. Oldfield Thomas named it in honor of Sidney Langford Hinde, a British officer and recreational naturalist.

Sources

Scotoecus
Taxa named by Oldfield Thomas
Mammals described in 1901
Bats of Africa
Taxonomy articles created by Polbot
Taxobox binomials not recognized by IUCN